The scale space representation of a signal obtained by Gaussian smoothing satisfies a number of special properties, scale-space axioms, which make it into a special form of multi-scale representation. There are, however, also other types of "multi-scale approaches" in the areas of computer vision, image processing and signal processing, in particular the notion of wavelets. The purpose of this article is to describe a few of these approaches:

Scale-space theory for one-dimensional signals

For one-dimensional signals, there exists quite a well-developed theory for continuous and discrete kernels that guarantee that new local extrema or zero-crossings cannot be created by a convolution operation. For continuous signals, it holds that all scale-space kernels can be decomposed into the following sets of primitive smoothing kernels:
 the Gaussian kernel : where ,
 truncated exponential kernels (filters with one real pole in the s-plane):
 if  and 0 otherwise where 
 if  and 0 otherwise where ,
 translations,
 rescalings.

For discrete signals, we can, up to trivial translations and rescalings, decompose any discrete scale-space kernel into the following primitive operations:
 the discrete Gaussian kernel
 where  where  are the modified Bessel functions of integer order,
 generalized binomial kernels corresponding to linear smoothing of the form
 where 
 where ,
 first-order recursive filters corresponding to linear smoothing of the form
 where 
 where ,
 the one-sided Poisson kernel
 for  where 
 for  where .

From this classification, it is apparent that we require a continuous semi-group structure, there are only three classes of scale-space kernels with a continuous scale parameter; the Gaussian kernel which forms the scale-space of continuous signals, the discrete Gaussian kernel which forms the scale-space of discrete signals and the time-causal Poisson kernel that forms a temporal scale-space over discrete time. If we on the other hand sacrifice the continuous semi-group structure, there are more options:

For discrete signals, the use of generalized binomial kernels provides a formal basis for defining the smoothing operation in a pyramid. For temporal data, the one-sided truncated exponential kernels and the first-order recursive filters provide a way to define time-causal scale-spaces  that allow for efficient numerical implementation and respect causality over time without access to the future. The first-order recursive filters also provide a framework for defining recursive approximations to the Gaussian kernel that in a weaker sense preserve some of the scale-space properties.

See also

 Scale space
 Scale space implementation
 Scale-space segmentation

References

Image processing
Computer vision